Dianne Byrum (born March 18, 1954) is an American University trustee and Democratic politician from Michigan. Byrum is a trustee for the Michigan State University and a partner with Byrum & Fisk Advocacy Communications, an East Lansing, Mich.-based public relations firm.

Early life 
On March 18, 1954, Byrum was born in Jackson, Michigan.

Education 
In 1973, Byrum earned an Associates of Art degree from Lansing Community College. In 1974, Byrum earned a Bachelor of Science degree from Michigan State University College of Agriculture.

Career 
In 1983, Byrum became the owner and operator of Byrum Ace Hardware.

In 1980, Byrum's political career started when she served as a Commissioner for Ingham County Board of Commissioner until 1990.
On November 6, 1990, Byrum won the election and became a Democratic member of Michigan House of Representatives for District 58. 
On January 9, 1991, Byrum was sworn into the office.
On November 3, 1992, Byrum won the election and became a Democratic member of Michigan House of Representatives for District 68. 
On January 13, 1993, Byrum sworn into office.
On November 8, 1994, Byrum won the election and became a member of Michigan Senate for District 25. 
On January 11, 1995, Byrum sworn into the office. 
In November 1996, as an incumbent state senator, Byrum won the election and continued serving District 25. 
In November 1998 as an incumbent, Byrum won the election and continued serving District 25. 
In November 2000, Byrum lost a US House election to Republican Mike Rogers.
On November 5, 2002, Byrum won the election and became a Democratic member of Michigan House of Representatives for District 67.
On November 2, 2004, as an incumbent, Byrum won the election and continued serving District 67.
In November 2006, Byrum did not seek a seat for District 67.

In 2008, Byrum was first elected to the Michigan State University board of trustees. 
In 2016, Byrum was re-elected as trustee. She was on the Board during the USA Gymnastics sex abuse scandal and was the second trustee calling for MSU President Lou Anna K. Simon to resign. 
In 2019, Byrum was elected as the chair person of Michigan State University Board of Trustee. Byrum's term ends in 2025.

Electoral history

Personal life 
Byrum's husband is Jim Byrum. They have two children, Barbara Byrum and James Byrum. Byrum and her family live in Onondaga, Michigan.

See also 
 2002 Michigan House of Representatives election
 2004 Michigan House of Representatives election

References

External links
 Dianne Byrum at ballotpedia.org
 Dianne Byrum at byrumfisk.com
 Trustee Dianne Byrum at trustees.msu.edu 
 Dianne Byrum in February 2008 Dome Magazine at blogpublic.lib.msu.edu
 Dianne Byrum at politicalgraveyard.com
 Dianne Byrum at bloomberg.com
Byrum sworn in as caucus leader (State News, Jan. 10, 2003)

County commissioners in Michigan
Democratic Party members of the Michigan House of Representatives
Living people
Michigan State University alumni
Women state legislators in Michigan
1954 births
20th-century American politicians
20th-century American women politicians
21st-century American politicians
21st-century American women politicians
Politicians from Jackson, Michigan